The 2008 MAAC men's basketball tournament was an NCAA college basketball tournament held at the Times Union Center in Albany, New York on March 7–10, 2007, to decide the Metro Atlantic Athletic Conference champion. On Monday, March 10 2008, top-seeded Siena defeated #2 seed Rider 74–53 in the championship game, and received the conference's automatic bid to the 2008 NCAA Men's Division I Basketball Tournament. Siena received a #13 seed and upset #4 seed Vanderbilt 83–62, then were defeated in the second round by #12 seed Villanova 84–72.

Seeds
All 10 teams in the conference participated in the Tournament. The top six teams received byes to the quarterfinals. Teams were seeded by record within the conference, with a tiebreaker system to seed teams with identical conference records.

Schedule

Bracket

Game summaries

First round

Quarterfinals

Semifinals

Championship

Honors

† Most Valuable Player

References

2007–08 Metro Atlantic Athletic Conference men's basketball season
MAAC men's basketball tournament
MAAC men's basketball tournament
MAAC men's basketball tournament
College basketball tournaments in New York (state)
Basketball competitions in Albany, New York